Streptomyces griseoloalbus is a bacterium species from the genus of Streptomyces which has been isolated from soil. Streptomyces griseoloalbus produces grisein.

Further reading

See also 
 List of Streptomyces species

References

External links
Type strain of Streptomyces griseoloalbus at BacDive -  the Bacterial Diversity Metadatabase

griseoloalbus
Bacteria described in 1958